Escape in the Fog is a 1945 American film noir crime film directed by Budd Boetticher (as Oscar Boetticher Jr.) and starring Otto Kruger, Nina Foch and William Wright.

Boetticher called it a "nothing" picture, though he enjoyed working with Nina Foch and Otto Kruger.

Plot
During World War II, a San Francisco nurse dreams of a murder and then meets the "victim" in real life. What she saw in the dream helps her in an effort to thwart enemy spies.

Cast
 Otto Kruger as Paul Devon
 Nina Foch as Eileen Carr
 William Wright as Barry Malcolm
 Konstantin Shayne as Schiller
 Ivan Triesault as Hausmer, Schiller's henchman
 Ernie Adams as George Smith
 Heinie Conklin as Witness (uncredited)
 Frank Mayo as Bartender (uncredited)

Reception

Film critic Jeremy Arnold gave the film a mixed review, writing "Although Wright and Foch have the most screen time, top billing goes to Otto Kruger, the immensely enjoyable character actor who specialized in charming, urbane villains. He's fine as always here but doesn't get much to do. William Wright was an unremarkable actor who appeared almost entirely in B movies in a 45-film career that spanned the 1940s."

References

External links
 
 
 
 

1945 films
American black-and-white films
Columbia Pictures films
1945 crime drama films
Film noir
Films directed by Budd Boetticher
American crime drama films
Films with screenplays by Aubrey Wisberg
Films set in San Francisco
Films set on the home front during World War II
Films about dreams
1940s English-language films
1940s American films